is a Japanese rower. He competed in the men's coxless pair event at the 1996 Summer Olympics.

References

1971 births
Living people
Japanese male rowers
Olympic rowers of Japan
Rowers at the 1996 Summer Olympics
Sportspeople from Shizuoka Prefecture